2DROTS is a Russian football club. It is based in Moscow. 2DROTS is one of the most popular media football teams in Russia.

YouTube channel 2DROTS was created on June 29, 2016. On 10 July, 2022, 2DROTS became champion of the first season of the Media Football League, and after that club was invited to the 2022–23 Russian Cup.

On December 3, 2022, 2DROTS became the winner of the 2nd season of the Media Football League.

Current squad 
As of 3 September 2022

References 

Association football clubs established in 2016
Football clubs in Russia
2016 establishments in Russia